Blanck Mass is the eponymous debut studio album by British musician Benjamin John Power, under his musical project Blanck Mass. It was released on 21 June 2011 by Rock Action Records. The album was re-issued as a deluxe version through Sacred Bones Records in 2020.

Background
Blanck Mass was written, recorded and produced in Power's apartment in London over the course of 2010.

Release
On 28 April 2011, Power announced he was releasing his debut eponymous album through Mogwai's Rock Action Records.

Singles
The first single "Land Disasters" was released on April 28, 2011.

Music videos
On 16 June 2011, the music video for "Icke's Struggle" was released.

Reissue
On 7 March 2020, it was announced at a Record Store Day event that Blanck Mass was re-issuing Blanck Mass as a double deluxe-LP by Sacred Bones Records on 18 April 2020 in the UK, and 24 April 2020 worldwide.

Critical reception
Blanck Mass was met with "generally favorable" reviews from critics. At Metacritic, which assigns a weighted average rating out of 100 to reviews from mainstream publications, this release received an average score of 71 based on 14 reviews. Aggregate website AnyDecentMusic? gave the release a 6.8 out of 10 based on a critical consensus of 19 reviews.

In a review for Consequence of Sound, critic reviewer Adam Kivel wrote: "While it may not be as primal as Street Horrrsing, or as concise as Tarot Sport, Blanck Mass’s self-titled debut packs the same sort of punch, and that punch is one that goes directly to the gut." At Beats Per Minute, the album was described as "an exhibition of some of the best sonic control and sound shaping around." Chris White of MusicOMH explained: "Blanck Mass sees Power going it alone for the first time and the end result is a self-titled debut album that’s both similar and different to Tarot Sport. The cinematic, epic scale and effective use of sound manipulations such as echo and distortion that made such an important contribution to the latter record are still very much in place on Blanck Mass. Laura Snapes of NME gave Blanck Mass two stars out of five.

Accolades

Track listing

References

External links
 
 

2011 debut albums
Blanck Mass albums
Rock Action Records albums